Family with sequence similarity 13, member C is a protein that in humans is encoded by the FAM13C gene.

References

Further reading 

 
 

Genes
Human proteins